Siege of Warangal may refer to:

 Siege of Warangal (1310) by Malik Kafur, a general of Ala al-Din Khalji
 Siege of Warangal (1318) by Khusrau Khan and other generals of Ala al-Din's son Mubarak Shah
 Siege of Warangal (1323) by Ulugh Khan (later Muhammad bin Tughluq), a general of Ghiyath al-Din Tughluq